Cercidoideae is a subfamily in the pea family, Fabaceae. Well-known members include Cercis (redbuds), including species widely cultivated as ornamental trees in the United States and Europe, Bauhinia, widely cultivated as an ornamental tree in tropical Asia, and Tylosema , a semi-woody genus of Africa. The subfamily occupies a basal position within the Fabaceae and is supported as monophyletic in many molecular phylogenies. At the 6th International Legume Conference, the Legume Phylogeny Working Group proposed elevating the tribe Cercidae to the level of subfamily within the Leguminosae (Fabaceae). The consensus agreed to the change, which was fully implemented in 2017. It has the following clade-based definition:
The most inclusive crown clade containing Cercis canadensis L. and Bauhinia divaricata L. but not Poeppigia procera C.Presl, Duparquetia orchidacea Baill., or Bobgunnia fistuloides (Harms) J.H.Kirkbr. & Wiersema.
Many genera show unique palynology.

Genera

Cercidoideae comprises the following genera organized into tribes:

Cercideae
 Adenolobus (Harv. ex Benth. & Hook.f.) Torre & Hillc.

 Cercis L.
 Griffonia Baill.

Bauhinieae

 Barklya F. Muell.
 Bauhinia L.

 Brenierea Humbert

 Cheniella R.Clark & Mackinder

 Gigasiphon Drake

 Lasiobema (Korth.) Miq.

 Lysiphyllum (Benth.) deWit

 Phanera Lour.
 Piliostigma Hochst.
 Schnella Raddi

 Tournaya A.Schmitz
 Tylosema (Schweinf.) Torre & Hillc.

Extinct
 †Bauhcis Calvillo-Canadell and Cevallos-Ferriz

Phylogeny
Molecular phylogenetics suggest the following relationships:

Notes

References

External links
 

 
Rosid subfamilies